The 2014–15 season will be Szombathelyi Haladás's 59th competitive season, 7th consecutive season in the OTP Bank Liga and 95th year in existence as a football club.

Players 
As of 20 January 2014.

Transfers

Summer

In:

Out:

Winter

In:

Out:

Statistics

Appearances and goals
Last updated on 26 October 2014.

|-
|colspan="14"|Youth players:

|-
|colspan="14"|Players no longer at the club:
|}

Top scorers
Includes all competitive matches. The list is sorted by shirt number when total goals are equal.

Last updated on 26 October 2014

Disciplinary record
Includes all competitive matches. Players with 1 card or more included only.

Last updated on 26 October 2014

Overall
{|class="wikitable"
|-
|Games played || 19 (12 OTP Bank Liga, 3 Hungarian Cup and 4 Hungarian League Cup)
|-
|Games won || 6 (2 OTP Bank Liga, 2 Hungarian Cup and 2 Hungarian League Cup)
|-
|Games drawn || 3 (2 OTP Bank Liga, 0 Hungarian Cup and 1 Hungarian League Cup)
|-
|Games lost || 10 (8 OTP Bank Liga, 1 Hungarian Cup and 1 Hungarian League Cup)
|-
|Goals scored || 22
|-
|Goals conceded || 22
|-
|Goal difference || 0
|-
|Yellow cards || 52
|-
|Red cards || 3
|-
|rowspan="2"|Worst discipline ||  Péter Halmosi (3 , 2 )
|-
|  Szilárd Devecseri (7 , 0 )
|-
|rowspan="1"|Best result || 7-0 (A) v Fertőszentmiklós - Magyar Kupa - 10-09-2014
|-
|rowspan="1"|Worst result || 0–3 (A) v Diósgyőr - OTP Bank Liga - 10-08-2014
|-
|rowspan="2"|Most appearances ||  Attila Szakály (16 appearances)
|-
|  Szilárd Devecseri (16 appearances)
|-
|rowspan="2"|Top scorer ||   Bálint Gaál (5 goals)
|-
|   Balázs Zamostny (5 goals)
|-
|Points || 21/57 (36.84%)
|-

Nemzeti Bajnokság I

Matches

League table

Results summary

Results by round

Hungarian Cup

Ligakupa

Group stage

Knockout phase

Friendly games (2014)

Friendly games (2015)

References

External links
 Eufo
 
 UEFA
 fixtures and results

Szombathelyi Haladás seasons
Hungarian football clubs 2014–15 season